Otto Neumann may refer to:
 Otto Neumann (athlete), German sprinter
 Otto Neumann (artist), German Expressionist painter and printmaker
 Otto C. Neumann, American politician